Pasalapudi  is a village in Rayavaram mandal, located in East Godavari district of the Indian state of Andhra Pradesh.

References 

Villages in East Godavari district